

Electrical resistivity

References

WEL
As quoted at http://www.webelements.com/ from these sources:
 G.W.C. Kaye and T. H. Laby in Tables of physical and chemical constants, Longman, London, UK, 15th edition, 1993.
 A.M. James and M.P. Lord in Macmillan's Chemical and Physical Data, Macmillan, London, UK, 1992.
 D.R. Lide, (ed.) in Chemical Rubber Company handbook of chemistry and physics, CRC Press, Boca Raton, Florida, USA, 79th edition, 1998.
 J.A. Dean (ed) in Lange's Handbook of Chemistry, McGraw-Hill, New York, USA, 14th edition, 1992.

CRC
As quoted from various sources in an online version of:
 David R. Lide (ed), CRC Handbook of Chemistry and Physics, 84th Edition. CRC Press. Boca Raton, Florida, 2003; Section 12, Properties of Solids; Electrical Resistivity of Pure Metals

CR2
As quoted in an online version of:
 David R. Lide (ed), CRC Handbook of Chemistry and Physics, 84th Edition. CRC Press. Boca Raton, Florida, 2003; Section 4, Properties of the Elements and Inorganic Compounds; Physical Properties of the Rare Earth Metals
which further refers to:
 Beaudry, B. J. and Gschneidner, K.A., Jr., in Handbook on the Physics and Chemistry of Rare Earths, Vol. 1, Gschneidner, K.A., Jr. and Eyring, L., Eds., North-Holland Physics, Amsterdam, 1978, 173.
 McEwen, K.A., in Handbook on the Physics and Chemistry of Rare Earths, Vol. 1, Gschneidner, K.A., Jr. and Eyring, L., Eds., North-Holland Physics, Amsterdam, 1978, 411.

LNG
As quoted from:
 J.A. Dean (ed), Lange's Handbook of Chemistry (15th Edition), McGraw-Hill, 1999; Section 4, Table 4.1 Electronic Configuration and Properties of the Elements

See also 

Chemical properties
Chemical element data pages
Elements